U.S. Route 130 (US 130) is a U.S. Highway that is a spur route of US 30, located completely within the state of New Jersey. It is signed with north and south cardinal directions, following a general northeast–southwest diagonal path, with north corresponding to the general eastward direction and vice versa. The route briefly runs concurrent with US 30 near Camden, about one-third of the way to New Brunswick. The road runs within a close distance of I-295 south of Bordentown and a few miles from the New Jersey Turnpike for its entire length, serving as a major four- to six-lane divided local road for most of its length. US 130 passes through many towns including Penns Grove, Bridgeport, Westville, Camden, Pennsauken, Burlington, Bordentown, Hightstown, and North Brunswick.

In 1916, pre-1927 Route 2 was designated to run along the present US 130 between the Camden area and Bordentown while pre-1927 Route 1 was to follow the current route between Robbinsville and New Brunswick. The current route between Penns Grove and Westville was to become pre-1927 Route 17S in 1923. In 1926, US 130 was designated to run from US 30 in Camden to US 1 in Trenton along the alignment of pre-1927 Route 2. A year later, the alignment of US 130 became Route 25 between Camden and Bordentown, Route 39 between Bordentown and White Horse, and Route 37 between White Horse and Trenton. US 130 was extended to Pennsville in 1938 along Route 45 and Route 44 while it was realigned to follow Route 25 and Route 25M between Bordentown and Route 27 in New Brunswick by the 1940s. In 1953, the state highways running concurrent with US 130 were removed. Around the time of the renumbering, limited-access bypasses for US 130 were built around Carneys Point and between Bridgeport and Westville; the former alignments eventually became Route 44.  In the 1960s, I-295 was designated onto most of these freeway alignments of US 130, which was moved back to its original route in Carneys Point. In 1969, the north end of US 130 was cut back to its current location, with the old road into New Brunswick becoming Route 171. The Delaware Valley Regional Planning Commission had proposed a US 130 freeway between Camden and Burlington, but it was never built.

Route description

Salem and Gloucester counties
US 130's south end is in Pennsville Township, Salem County at the east end of the Delaware Memorial Bridge, which carries I-295 and US 40. The New Jersey Turnpike begins at this interchange, and Route 49 heads south.  From here, the route heads northeast on Shell Road, a two-lane undivided road, passing development before entering Carneys Point Township. In Carneys Point Township, the road intersects the west end of Route 140 before passing to the east of a DuPont plant and a Conrail Shared Assets Operations (CSAO) railroad yard near wooded areas. US 130 makes a turn to the north into more residential development, crossing into Penns Grove, where the route turns northeast again as Virginia Avenue and intersects the western terminus of Route 48. Past the Route 48 intersection, the road enters Carneys Point Township again and crosses CSAO's Penns Grove Secondary railroad line before continuing through a mix of agricultural and industrial areas. Upon entering Oldmans Township, US 130 heads through more rural areas as Bridgeport-Penns Grove Road.

After crossing Oldmans Creek on a former drawbridge, the route enters Logan Township, Gloucester County and becomes a four-lane divided highway called Crown Point Road.  It heads east-northeast through Nortonville before continuing through marshland and woodland. After crossing  Raccoon Creek on a fixed bridge, the road passes some homes in Bridgeport before reaching a cloverleaf interchange with US 322/CR 536 that provides access to the Commodore Barry Bridge. At this point, a freeway section of US 130 begins. The freeway heads east to its first interchange after US 322, a right-in/right-out at Barker Avenue, with an overpass just to the west at Springers Road. Barker Avenue leads east to the south end of Route 44.  The next interchange provides direct access to Route 44. After Route 44, the route passes over CSAO's Penns Grove Secondary railroad line. Following this, the highway has an interchange with Cedar Swamp Road before US 130 merges into I-295 for a concurrency.

Along I-295, the route is a six-lane freeway, coming to an exit for CR 684. Continuing east, the freeway crosses into Greenwich Township and has an interchange with CR 607. After passing near Greenwich Lake, there are exits for CR 653 and CR 673 within a short distance of each other.  I-295/US 130 reaches an interchange with CR 680 on the border of Greenwich Township and East Greenwich Township. The road runs through a portion of East Greenwich Township before crossing back into Greenwich Township and coming to an interchange with CR 678 and CR 667 on the border of Greenwich Township and Paulsboro. Past this point, the freeway runs through marshy areas of Mantua Creek and continues into West Deptford Township.  Here, there is an exit for CR 656. Passing near more industrial areas, I-295/US 130 has an interchange with the Mid-Atlantic Parkway, which provides access to Route 44 as well as to CR 643 and CR 660. Continuing northeast, the freeway passes over CSAO's Penns Grove Secondary and reaches an interchange with Route 44 and CR 640. At this point, Route 44 begins to parallel I-295/US 130 on its northwest side as the two roads cross the Woodbury Creek. Route 44 ends at a cul-de-sac that has a ramp from the southbound direction of I-295/US 130 prior to another interchange that provides access to CR 644. The freeway passes near some homes before US 130 splits from I-295.

After splitting from I-295, US 130 continues northeast as a four-lane divided road called Crown Point Avenue. The route passes past an oil refinery before forming the border between West Deptford Township to the north and Westville to the south, where it begins to pass residences along the south side of the road. The road fully enters Westville before encountering the northern terminus of Route 45 at a Y-intersection. Past this intersection, the lanes of US 130 split briefly before rejoining.

Camden County
Upon crossing Big Timber Creek, the route enters Brooklawn, Camden County, where the name becomes Crescent Boulevard and it comes to a traffic circle with CR 551. Here, US 130 and CR 551 head concurrent to the east, passing under CSAO's Vineland Secondary railroad line, and come to another traffic circle. At this circle, Route 47 and CR 551 head south while US 130 continues east on Crescent Boulevard, lined with suburban shopping centers.  After CR 551 Spur heads east, US 130 makes a turn to the northeast, widening into a six-lane highway with many intersections controlled by jughandles and crossing Little Timber Creek into Gloucester City. In Glocuester City, the median of the route widens as it interchanges with I-76 at a partial interchange. From this interchange, the road continues north-northeast heads across CSAO's Grenloch Industrial Track line and crosses Newton Creek into Haddon Township. US 130 comes to an interchange with  Route 76C that has access towards I-76, I-676, and the Walt Whitman Bridge to and from the northbound direction of US 130. The highway continues to a channelized intersection with Route 168. Following this intersection, US 130 continues through urban areas, passing through a small corner of Camden before entering Collingswood as it crosses under CSAO's Beesleys Point Secondary railroad line. In Collingswood, the road is lined with suburban businesses again prior to meeting US 30 at the former Collingswood Circle.

At this point, US 30 forms a concurrency with US 130 and the two routes head north, passing under the PATCO Speedline before meeting CR 561 at an interchange. Past CR 561, the road passes to the east of Harleigh Cemetery prior to crossing Cooper River into Pennsauken Township. In Pennsauken, US 30/US 130 comes to the Airport Circle. Airport Circle is an intersection with several flyovers; US 30 splits to the west, while Route 38 heads east, soon splitting with Route 70. US 130, meanwhile, continues northeast through more commercial areas. The road briefly enters Camden again right before an interchange with CR 537 in Pennsauken Township, passing under an abandoned railroad line a short distance later. The route crosses under NJ Transit’s Atlantic City Line before coming to a large interchange with Route 90 that provides access to the Betsy Ross Bridge. Within this interchange, the lanes of US 130 split. A short distance later, the route reaches an interchange with Route 73, which runs to the Tacony–Palmyra Bridge.

Burlington County
A short distance after the Route 73 interchange, US 130 crosses North Branch of Pennsauken Creek into Cinnaminson Township, Burlington County, and continues northeast.  The route turns to the east-northeast and enters Delran Township, where there is an interchange with CR 613. Immediately after this interchange, the road crosses Rancocas Creek and forms the border between Delanco Township to the northwest and Willingboro Township to the southeast as it passes a couple of lakes. US 130 continues along the border of Edgewater Park Township and Willingboro Township. After briefly forming the border between Burlington Township and Willingboro Township, the road entirely enters Burlington Township.  The route forms a concurrency with CR 543 prior to entering Burlington. A bypass takes US 130 and CR 543 around the downtown area of Burlington. The road comes to an intersection with the eastern terminus of Route 413, which provides access to the Burlington–Bristol Bridge. Past this intersection, US 130/CR 543 turns east, with the median widening to include businesses. Along this portion of road, there is an intersection with the northern terminus of CR 541.  The six-lane section of US 130 decreases to four lanes as it crosses  Assicunk Creek, where the median also narrows. The road turns northeast into a residential area, and CR 543 splits from US 130 by heading to the east.

Past this intersection, US 130 passes some businesses and crosses back into Burlington Township, where it runs a short distance to the southeast of NJ Transit's River Line. The road enters less dense commercial and industrial development, along with some farmland and woodland, as it continues into Florence Township. The route reaches an interchange with the Pearl Harbor Memorial Extension of the New Jersey Turnpike (I-95) in Florence Township. Following this interchange, US 130 continues through development before crossing Crafts Creek into Mansfield Township Here, the surroundings become more wooded with a few areas of agriculture. The route continues into Bordentown Township, where the road widens to six lanes as it has a partial cloverleaf interchange with I-295. From this point, US 130 continues to an intersection with CR 545, where it narrows back to four lanes. The surroundings become more developed as US 130 merges with US 206 at an interchange, bypassing Bordentown to the east. The two routes continue north on a six-lane divided highway, briefly skirting the eastern edge of Bordentown as the road crosses CR 528. After entering Bordentown Township again, US 130 splits from US 206 by heading to the northeast at an interchange. Upon splitting, the route becomes a four-lane divided highway again, passing homes and businesses with areas of woods.

Mercer and Middlesex counties

After crossing Crosswicks Creek, US 130 continues into Hamilton Township, Mercer County, where Route 156 splits to the west to parallel US 130 as it bypasses Yardville to the east. The route intersects several roads at northbound-only interchanges, including CR 609, CR 672 (South Broad Street), and CR 524 (Yardville-Allentown Road);  Route 156 provides southbound access.  Past these interchanges, the road passes some homes before Route 156 merges back into it. From this point, US 130 runs through commercial areas, where it has a brief six-lane segment prior to reaching a cloverleaf interchange with I-195. Following this interchange, the road enters Robbinsville Township.  In Robbinsville, the route forms a short concurrency with CR 526. At the point CR 526 turns east, Route 33 joins US 130 from the west. US 130 and Route 33 run together through rural areas with some development. The road bypasses Windsor to the east prior to entering East Windsor Township. Here, the road widens to six lanes and Route 33 splits from US 130, heading east into Hightstown. US 130 narrows back to four lanes and runs around the commercial west side of Hightstown, crossing CR 571. Shortly after this intersection, the route has a partial cloverleaf interchange with Route 133.

US 130 crosses Millstone River into Cranbury Township, Middlesex County, where it has an intersection with the northern terminus of CR 539. From this point, the route heads north through a mix of rural surroundings and inhabited neighborhoods, bypassing downtown Cranbury to the east and crossing CR 615. Past this intersection, the road continues into development, crossing Brainerd Lake before forming a short concurrency with CR 535. US 130 briefly forms the border between South Brunswick Township to the west and Cranbury Township to the east before fully entering South Brunswick Township as the road runs through a mix of rural areas and business parks. The road comes to a directional Y-intersection with the western terminus of Route 32, which  provides access to the New Jersey Turnpike and Monroe Township. A park and ride lot serving Coach USA buses to New York City is located west of this intersection. Following Route 32, US 130 crosses over CSAO's Amboy Secondary railroad line before coming to an interchange with CR 522.  At this point, CR 522 forms a brief concurrency with US 130 before splitting to the west. After the CR 522 concurrency, the route continues north into mostly forested areas, crossing Davidsons Mill Pond before continuing into North Brunswick Township. In North Brunswick Township, the road heads northeast through increasing development as the route starts to turn more to the north. US 130 comes to an end at an interchange with US 1, where the road continues north as Route 171 (Georges Road) into New Brunswick.

History

What is now US 130 was a part of two Lenape trails: the Pensaukin Trail, running from what is now Camden to Crosswick; and the Lower Assunpink or Crosswicksung Trail, running from there north to Ahandewamock Village, near modern-day New Brunswick. The section of this trail between Crosswicks and Cranbury became part of a King's Highway connecting South Amboy and Salem. North of Cranbury, the Assunpink trail was later called the Lower Road, then George's Road. The route was incorporated into several turnpikes in the 19th century. In 1808, the Burlington Turnpike was chartered to run from Burlington north to the Trenton and New Brunswick Turnpike through Bordentown. The Bordentown and South Amboy Turnpike was chartered in 1818 to run from Bordentown to South Amboy, bypassing the King's Highway from East Brunswick to Cranbury. In 1849 the Westfield and Camden Turnpike was legislated along the Burlington Road from Camden to the bridge at Rancoas Creek. The New Brunswick and Cranbury Turnpike was chartered in 1865 to run from the Bordentown-South Amboy Turnpike to New Brunswick along the old George's Road.

The entire length of US 130 follows a part of the Ocean Highway, a coastal highway that ran from New Brunswick south to Jacksonville, Florida. The stretch from New Brunswick to Robbinsville was signed as the Cranbury Trail, an alternative to the Lincoln Highway running from New Brunswick to Trenton. The current route was designated as portions of three state routes prior to 1927. In 1916, the road between the Camden area and Bordentown was legislated as part of pre-1927 Route 2 while the current US 130 north of Robbinsville was to become a part of pre-1927 Route 1. In addition, pre-1927 Route 17S was legislated to run from Penns Grove northeast to Westville in 1923; the only portion of road built ran from Pennsville south to Salem. When the U.S. Highway System was established in 1926, US 130 was designated to connect US 30 in Camden to US 1 in Trenton, following pre-1927 Route 2. In the 1927 renumbering a year later, the US 130 alignment was designated Route 25 from Camden to Bordentown, Route 39 from Bordentown to White Horse, and Route 37 from White Horse to Trenton.

By 1938, US 130 was extended south along Route 45 and Route 44 to end at US 40 in Pennsville where the connection to Hook Road now hits Route 49.  By the 1940s, it was rerouted to follow Route 25 and Route 25M from Bordentown to Route 27 in New Brunswick The former US 130 between Bordentown and Trenton was designated as a part of US 206. During the 1940s, a new alignment for US 130 was built through South Brunswick Township. After the Delaware Memorial Bridge opened in 1951, the south end of US 130 was moved to its current location. Shortly before the 1953 New Jersey state highway renumbering, US 130 was aligned to bypass Yardville with the old route becoming Route 156 in 1953. Also, prior to 1953, US 130 had been aligned to bypass Carneys Point and a stretch of Route 44 between Bridgeport and Westville.

In the 1953 renumbering, US 130 replaced Route 44 and parts of Route 45 and Route 25, as well as the short Route 25M into New Brunswick. With the 1953 renumbering freeing up the Route 44 designation, that number was eventually assigned to the two sections of old road.  In the 1960s, I-295 was built through Salem and Gloucester counties, following a portion of the US 130 freeway bypass of Carneys Point as well as the freeway portion of the route from north of Bridgeport to Westville. As a result of this construction, US 130 was moved back to its original alignment in Carneys Point, replacing that portion of Route 44. US 130 was cut back to its current north end at US 1 in 1969, and the continuation into New Brunswick was assigned Route 171.

In the late 1960s, a freeway was proposed by the Delaware Valley Regional Planning Commission to alleviate traffic on US 130 between Camden and Burlington. This freeway was originally planned as a parkway between the two cities in 1932 that never materialized. The proposed freeway, which was to connect the Ben Franklin Bridge to I-295 near the Assicunk Creek, was to cost $53 million and mostly follow a Conrail railroad line between the two cities. However, the NJDOT never followed through with the proposal. 

Construction in 2001 replaced a modified traffic circle at US 130's northern terminus at US 1 and Route 171 in North Brunswick with an interchange. A service road was also built to serve the nearby shopping centers and Milltown Road (CR 606). This project was completed in July 2003. In 2009, the Collingswood Circle at the southern terminus of the US 30 concurrency was replaced with an at-grade intersection with jughandles.

In 2013 the road was one of three that tied for the #1 ranking on the Tri-State Transportation Campaign's list of the top ten most dangerous roads for pedestrians in New Jersey, New York and Connecticut. The route, along with US 40/US 322 in Atlantic County and US 1 in Middlesex County, were so ranked due to the nine pedestrian deaths that occurred on each of those roads from 2009 to 2011.

Major intersections

See also

References

External links

Endpoints of U.S. Highway 130
Enlarged view of confluence of I-295, US40, US 130, NJ 49, NJ140 and the NJTP in the area of Carneys Point Township
Enlarged view of confluence of I-295 and US 130 in the area of West Deptford Township
Enlarged view of confluence of I-76 and US 130 in the area of Haddon Township
Enlarged view of confluence of US 30, US 130 and NJ 138 in the area of Pennsauken Township
Enlarged view of confluence of US 130 and NJ 90 in Pennsauken Township
Speed Limits for State Roads: U.S. Route 130

Limited-access roads in New Jersey
30-1
Transportation in Burlington County, New Jersey
Transportation in Camden County, New Jersey
Transportation in Gloucester County, New Jersey
Transportation in Mercer County, New Jersey
Transportation in Middlesex County, New Jersey
Transportation in Salem County, New Jersey
30-1
1